Karutha Pournami is a 1968 Indian Malayalam film, directed by Narayanankutty Vallath and produced by N. G. Menon. The film stars Madhu, Sharada, P. J. Antony and Bahadoor in the lead roles. The film had musical score by M. K. Arjunan.

Cast
Madhu
Sharada
P. J. Antony
Bahadoor
Jayanthi
S. P. Pillai
Vijayanirmala
Xavier
Baby Gracy
Johnson

Soundtrack
The music was composed by M. K. Arjunan and the lyrics were written by P. Bhaskaran.

References

External links
 

1968 films
1960s Malayalam-language films